John Gaver may refer to:
 John M. Gaver Sr., American racehorse trainer
 John M. Gaver Jr., his son, American racehorse trainer